John Stanger (active 1932–37) was an English footballer who played as an outside right in the Football League for Stockport County and Darlington. He also played for North Eastern League club Workington.

Stanger was a member of the Workington team that in the 1933–34 season won eight games in a row in the North Eastern League and reached the fourth round of the 1933–34 FA Cup. He scored one of the goals as Workington came back from 3–1 down to beat Manchester North End in the fourth qualifying round replay, scored the only goal of the first round match against Southport, and in the fourth round, against Second Division club Preston North End, he indirectly gave his team the lead when from his corner kick, goalkeeper Harry Holdcroft could only punch the ball into his own net. He moved on to Third Division North club Stockport County, but played infrequently: over two seasons, he scored twice from 14 league matches, and played one FA Cup and two Third Division North Cup matches. He then spent the 1936–37 season with division rivals Darlington, playing more regularly, with five goals from 21 league matches.

References

Year of birth missing
Year of death missing
Footballers from Carlisle, Cumbria
English footballers
Association football wingers
Workington A.F.C. players
Stockport County F.C. players
Darlington F.C. players
English Football League players
Place of death missing